Jhaniele Fowler (formerly known as Jhaniele Fowler-Reid; born 21 July 1989) is a professional Jamaican netball player and as of 2018 a member of the  West Coast Fever in the Suncorp Super Netball League. Fowler also plays domestic netball in Jamaica for the Waulgrovians club, and has been a member of the Jamaica national netball team (the Sunshine Girls) since 2010. 

Fowler has competed at three World Netball Series tournaments with the Jamaica national team, winning a bronze medal in 2010. She has also competed at the 2010 Commonwealth Games in Delhi and the 2011 World Netball Championships in Singapore.

In 2011, Fowler was signed to play in the Australasian ANZ Championship with Australian team, the Adelaide Thunderbirds, on a two-year contract. Her contract was contingent on the Thunderbirds' current import, fellow Jamaican shooter Carla Borrego, on gaining Australian citizenship, and allowing the team's import spot for Fowler. However, Borrego was unable to gain citizenship in time for the 2012 season, and Fowler did not play with the Thunderbirds. She was later approached by New Zealand–based team, the Southern Steel, who signed her on a one-year contract for the 2013 season.

In 2016 Fowler was awarded the "Player of the series" award, as a member of a Jamaican team that took part in a tour of one of England, playing at Manchester, Coventry and London. Jamaica won a historic 2-1 series victory over a side that less than 3 years later went on to win a gold at the Commonwealth Games in Australia.   

Fowler returned to the Australian domestic scene in 2018, where she played for West Coast Fever and was dominant. She won the leading goalscorer award with 783 goals, which is the current record, and was also awarded the competition's player of the year title. She won the leading goalscorer award for a second consecutive season in 2019 and capped off the year by becoming the first player in the league's history to win multiple Player of the Year awards.

In 2022 Jhanielle was a major part of the Jamaican team, that achieved a up to then Sunshine Girls high, of a silver medal at the Commonwealth games in Birminghham. Losing to Australia in the final, after defeating New Zealand in the semis, and sides such as South Africa and even Australia in the group stage. With there also being a match with Barbados that saw over 100 goals recorded by Jhanielle's team. 

Outside of netball, Fowler married Andre Reid in December 2013 when she added Reid to her last name. The couple have one child.

External links
 Suncorp Super Netball profile
 West Coast Fever Profile

References

Jamaican netball players
Netball players at the 2010 Commonwealth Games
Southern Steel players
ANZ Championship players
1989 births
Living people
Commonwealth Games bronze medallists for Jamaica
Netball players at the 2014 Commonwealth Games
Commonwealth Games medallists in netball
Netball players at the 2018 Commonwealth Games
2019 Netball World Cup players
Jamaican expatriate netball people in Australia
Jamaican expatriate netball people in New Zealand
Suncorp Super Netball players
Mavericks netball players
West Coast Fever players
2011 World Netball Championships players
Medallists at the 2014 Commonwealth Games
Medallists at the 2018 Commonwealth Games
Medallists at the 2022 Commonwealth Games